The Cippi of Melqart are a pair of Phoenician marble cippi that were unearthed in Malta under undocumented circumstances and dated to the 2nd century BC. These are votive offerings to the god Melqart, and are inscribed in two languages, Ancient Greek and Phoenician, and in the two corresponding scripts, the Greek and the Phoenician alphabet. They were discovered in the late 17th century, and the identification of their inscription in a letter dated 1694 made them the first Phoenician writing to be identified and published in modern times. Because they present essentially the same text (with some minor differences), the cippi provided the key to the modern understanding of the Phoenician language. In 1758, the French scholar Jean-Jacques Barthélémy relied on their inscription, which used 17 of the 22 letters of the Phoenician alphabet, to decipher the unknown language.

The tradition that the cippi were found in Marsaxlokk was only inferred by their dedication to Heracles, whose temple in Malta had long been identified with the remains at Tas-Silġ. The Grand Master of the Order of the Knights Hospitaller, Fra Emmanuel de Rohan-Polduc, presented one of the cippi to Louis XVI in 1782. This cippus is currently in the Louvre Museum in Paris, while the other rests in the National Museum of Archaeology in Valletta, Malta. The inscription is known as KAI 47.

Description and history

The importance of the cippi to Maltese archaeology is inestimable. On an international level, they already played a significant role in the deciphering and study of the Phoenician language in the 18th and 19th centuries.  Such was their importance to Phoenician and Punic philology, that the inscriptions on the cippi became known as the Inscriptio melitensis prima bilinguis (Latin for First bilingual Maltese inscription), or the Melitensis prima (First Maltese).

A cippus (plural cippi) is a small column. Cippi serve as milestones, funerary monuments, markers, or votive offerings. The earliest cippi had a cubic shape and were carved from sandstone. By the late fifth century BC, these became gabled delicate stelae in the Greek fashion. "Their form is light and gracefully executed ..." with a " ...Greek inscription upon the pedestal, [and] a masterpiece of Phoenician epigraphy." The artifacts are carved in white marble, a stone which is not found naturally in the Maltese islands. As it is unlikely that skilled marble-carvers were available, they were probably imported in their finished state. The inscriptions, however, were probably engraved in Malta on behalf of the two patrons, Abdosir and Osirxamar. Judging by the names on the main inscription, the patrons were of Tyrian extraction. The addition of a synopsis of the dedication in Greek, with the names of the dedicators and of Melqart given in their Hellenised versions, confirms the existence and influence of Hellenistic culture. Additionally, while Malta had been colonised by the Phoenicians since the 8th century BC, by the second century, the Maltese islands were under Roman occupation. The use of Phoenician script also confirms the survival of Phoenician culture and religion on the islands.

Although it is not rare for cippi to have dedications,  the Cippi of Melqart have an unusual construction, as they have two parts. The base, or pedestal, is a rectangular block with mouldings at the top and bottom.  The inscriptions in Greek and Phoenician are at the front, three lines in Greek and four in Phoenician. The inscriptions are lightly incised.  The bases support pillars which are interpreted as candelabra. The lower parts of the candelabra are decorated with a shallow relief of acanthus leaves. Calligraphic differences in the incised text, varying positioning of the words and differences in the depth of the relief and the mouldings, imply that the two cippi are separate offerings, carrying the same inscription because the patrons were brothers.

When the Greek inscription was published in the third volume of the Corpus Inscriptionum Graecarum in 1853, the cippi were described as discovered in the coastal village of Marsaxlokk. Before, their Marsaxlokk provenance had not been proposed by anyone, and it was more than a century later that the claim was discredited. The attribution to Tas-Silġ was apparently reached by inference, because the candelabra were thought, with some plausibility, to have been dedicated and set up inside the temple of Heracles.

Inscriptions on the Cippi

The Phoenician inscription reads (from right to left; characters inside brackets denote a filled in lacuna):
{| cellpadding="0" style="border-style:none; border-collapse:collapse; background: none; font-family: 'ALPHABETUM Unicode', 'MPH 2B Damase', Aegean, Code2001, 'Free Sans'; font-size:150%;"
|-
|align="right"|
|-
|align="right"|
|-
|align="right"|
|-
|align="right"|
|}

Transcription of the Phoenician text (read from left to right as if reading the previous text from right to left, and also adding spaces):
lʾdnn lmlqrt bʿl ṣr ʾš ndr
ʿbd[k] ʿbdʾsr wʾḥy ʾsršmr
šn bn ʾsršmr bn ʿbdʾsr kšmʿ
qlm ybrkm

Translation of the Phoenician text:
To our lord Melqart, Lord of Tyre, dedicated by
your servant Abd' Osir and his brother 'Osirshamar
both sons of 'Osirshamar, son of Abd' Osir, for he heard
their voice, may he bless them.

The Greek inscription is the following:

Rendering to the later polytonic and bicameral script and adding spaces, the Greek text becomes:

Transliteration of the Greek text (including accents):
Dionýsios kaì Sarapíōn hoi
Sarapíōnos Týrioi
Hērakleî archēgétei

Translation of the Greek:
Dionysios and Sarapion, the
sons of Sarapion, Tyrenes,
to Heracles the founder.

Discovery and publication

Initial identification
In 1694, a Maltese canonicus, Ignazio di Costanzo, was the first to report an inscription on the cippi which he considered to be in the Phoenician language. This identification was on the basis that "Phoenicians" were recorded as ancient inhabitants of Malta by Greek writers Thucydides and Diodorus Siculus. Costanzo spotted these inscriptions, which were part of two almost identical votive cippi at the entrance of Villa Abela in Marsa, the house of the celebrated Maltese historian, Gian Franġisk Abela.  {{refn|group=n|The villa was demolished by the British colonial administration to build a power station.<ref>Grima, Noel (2 May 2016). The historical antecedents of the Marsa Power Station. The Malta Independent. Retrieved 12 July 2016.</ref>}} Di Costanzo immediately recognised the Greek inscriptions, and he thought the other parts were written in Phoenician. However, the Maltese historian Ciantar claimed that the cippi were discovered in 1732, and placed the discovery in the villa of Abela, which had become a museum entrusted to the Jesuits. The contradiction in the dates of the discovery is confusing, given di Costanzo's 1694 letter.

Ignazio Paternò, prince of Biscari, reports another story regarding their discovery. Paternò describes how two candelabri were stored at the Bibliotecha, after they had been found on the island of Gozo. Paternò attributes the discovery to Fr. Anton Maria Lupi, who had found the two votive cippi with the Phoenician inscriptions abandoned in a villa owned by the Jesuit Order in Gozo, linking them with the cippi mentioned by Ciantar.

Copies of the inscriptions, which had been made by Giovanni Uvit in 1687, were sent to Verona to an art historian, poet and Knight Commander in the Hospitaller order, Bartolomeo dal Pozzo. These were then handed to another Veronese noble art collector, Francesco Sparaviero who wrote a translation of the Greek section.

In 1753, Abbé Guyot de Marne, also a Knight Commander of the Maltese Order, published the text again in an Italian journal, the Saggi di dissertazioni accademiche of the Etruscan Academy of Cortona, but did not hypothesise a translation. The first attempt had come in 1741, by the French scholar Michel Fourmont, who had published his assumptions in the same journal. However, neither led to a useful translation.

Deciphering the Phoenician script

The shorter Phoenician text was transliterated and translated more than twenty years after Fourmont's publication, by the Abbé Jean-Jacques Barthélemy. Barthélemy, who had already translated Palmyrene, submitted his work in 1758.

He correctly identified 16 of the 17 different letters represented in the text, but still mistook the Shin and the He. Barthélémy began the translation of the script by reading the first word "lʾdnn" as "to our lord." The hypothesis that Heracles corresponded with Melqart, Lord of Tyre, made Barthélemy pinpoint more letters, while the names of the patrons, being the sons of the same father in the Greek text, allowed the backward induction of the father's name in the Phoenician text.

The Phoenician script, once translated read:

"To our lord Melqart, Lord of Tyre, dedicated by / your servant Abd' Osir and his brother 'Osirshamar / both sons of 'Osirshamar, son of Abd' Osir, for he heard / their voice, may he bless them."

The paleographic table published by Barthélémy lacked the letters Tet and Pe. The study of the Phoenician inscription on the base of the Louvre cippus can be regarded as the true foundation of Phoenician and Punic studies, at a time when the Phoenicians and their civilisation were known only through classical or Biblical texts.

Later work

Work on the cippi now focused on a fuller understanding of Phoenician grammar, as well as the implications of the discovery of Phoenician texts in Malta. Johann Joachim Bellermann believed that the Maltese language was a distant descendant of Punic.  This was refuted by Wilhelm Gesenius, who like Abela before him, held that Maltese was a dialect of Arabic. Further studies on the Melitensis prima text followed developments in the study of Phoenician grammar, comparing Punic specimens closely with Hebrew texts. In 1772, Francisco Pérez Bayer published a book detailing the previous attempts at understanding the text, and provided his own interpretation and translation.

In 1782, Emmanuel de Rohan-Polduc, Grand Master of the Order of Malta, presented one of the cippi to Louis XVI. The cippus was placed at the Académie des Inscriptions et des Belles Lettres, and then moved to the Bibliothèque Mazarine between 1792 and 1796.   In 1864, the orientalist Silvestre de Sacy, suggested that the French cippus should be moved to the Louvre.

Idiomatic use and cultural impact

The term Rosetta stone of Malta'' has been used idiomatically to represent the role played by the cippi in decrypting the Phoenician alphabet and language. The cippi themselves became a treasured symbol of Malta.  Their image has appeared on local postage stamps, and hand-crafted models of the artifacts have been presented to visiting dignitaries.

Notes and references 
Notes

References

Bibliography

See also

Votive Stones of Pesaro, ancient cippi
Lucus Pisaurensis, sacred grove of Pesaro
Encryption
Linear A, one of two currently undeciphered writing systems used in ancient Crete
Transliteration of Ancient Egyptian
Greek–Punic Wars

External links
The Enlightenment and Ancient Scripts in The British Museum

2nd-century BC steles
1694 archaeological discoveries
Greek inscriptions
KAI inscriptions
Marble
History of Malta
Archaeological discoveries in Malta
Near East and Middle East antiquities of the Louvre
Multilingual texts
Phoenician inscriptions
Votive offering
Phoenician steles
Steles
Archaeological artifacts